Nicholas Dumovich (January 2, 1902 in Sacramento, California – December 12, 1978 in Laguna Hills, California) was a pitcher in Major League Baseball. He pitched in 28 games for the Chicago Cubs during the 1923 Chicago Cubs season.

References

External links

1902 births
1978 deaths
Major League Baseball pitchers
Baseball players from Sacramento, California
Chicago Cubs players